Bleek may mean:

Dorothea Bleek (1873-1948), German anthropologist and philologist
Friedrich Bleek (1793-1859), German biblical scholar
Karl Theodor Bleek (1898-1969), German politician
Wilhelm Bleek (1827-1875), German linguist
Memphis Bleek or Bleek, stage name of New York rapper Malik Cox (born 1978)
 Bleek Gilliam, main character of the 1990 film Mo' Better Blues, played by Denzel Washington

See also
 Bleak (disambiguation)